Dmytro Chobit (19 February 1952, Brody, Ukrainian SSR) is a Ukrainian historian, publicist (opinion journalism), and politician.

Chobit specializes in local studies and is a member of the National Union of Local Historians of Ukraine, the Shevchenko Society of Ukrainian Language, and the National Writer's Union of Ukraine. Chobit became known for his scandal with Viktor Medvedchuk in 2003, when Medvedchuk filed a court case against him for the Chobit's book "Narcissus" (Нарцис).

Bibliography
 Brody – overview of local history, 1984
 In the parliament of new Ukraine, 1995
 Pidhirtsi. Historical and architectural pearl of Ukraine, 1998
 Whistler, 1999
 Battle near Berestechko
 Time of disgraceful authority or whether the Gongadze case is the case of Kuchma? (2001)
 Narcissus. Features of the Viktor Medvedchuk's political portrait, (2002)

References

External links
 1990-1994 convocation. Verkhovna Rada.
 1994-1998 convocation. Verkhovna Rada.
 1998-2002 convocation. Verkhovna Rada.
 Profile at the Official Ukraine Today

1952 births
Living people
People from Brody
Taras Shevchenko National University of Kyiv, Historical faculty alumni
20th-century Ukrainian historians
Ukrainian writers
People's Movement of Ukraine politicians
All-Ukrainian Union "Fatherland" politicians
First convocation members of the Verkhovna Rada
Second convocation members of the Verkhovna Rada
Third convocation members of the Verkhovna Rada